The Silver Condor Award for Best Foreign Film , presented by the Argentine Film Critics Association, honors the best foreign-language film of the year.

 
Argentine Film Critics Association